Francis Henry Pullen (8 September 1915 – 17 January 1992) was an English businessperson and racehorse owner.

Early life
He was born, the youngest of four children, as Francis Henry Pullen to Arthur James and Alice Pullen (née Richards)  at Catford, South London and great nephew to James Pullen. His father died while serving with the Royal Navy during World War I and Alice Pullen had to support her children during the Depression. Young Pullen found work feeding the local workhorses, earning a shilling a week, showing early entrepreneurial flair and sparking his love of horses. Pullen married aged 17 and became a chef.

War years
Pullen enlisted in the British Army at the start of World War II and was one of the survivors of D-Day, landing at Gold Beach. Later during the conflict he helped liberate the Belgian town of Lessines. The grateful town gave him the freedom of the city and he later named three of his homes (one in Bromley, south London, one in Lee, South London and one in Looe, Cornwall, where he would holiday).

Pullen Estates

After he was demobilised from the army in 1948, Pullen started in business as a builder in a war-torn South London and became a member of the National House Building Council. Pullen became one of South London's leading property developers, and incorporated his business in 1962, using the slogan "We Build To Please" . Pullen specialised at first in renovating houses before concentrating on new builds; his first being "Karen Court", Blyth Road, Bromley, a block of three maisonettes. Other early examples of Pullen's can be seen with the bungalows of Clarence Road, Croydon. Pullen soon progressed to blocks of flats (such as Tina Court, Knollys Road, Streatham and at Ravensbourne Park Crescent, Catford, along with Colin Court).

Pullen moved on to housing estates, building over one hundred major developments. At Iona Court in Catford stands a type of Pullen's apartments that were purpose-built for Lewisham Council. In his later buildings, Pullen often employed the services of the architect and Le Corbusier admirer Joyce Lowman. Pullen gained a reputation as a builder of innovative houses and luxury apartments, and examples of these buildings can be found at Florida Court in Bromley, with three blocks in a low-density, five-acre landscaped plot. At Beulah Hill Pullen built Tropicana, a groundbreaking block of flats to Lowmans design, climbing up Spurgeon Road with balconies having a grand view over southwest London.  Seychelle Court and Montreux Court  in Beckenham continued his theme of building courts with exotic names. Pullen also built the Parklands apartments (with roof gardens overlooking Kelsey Park), Parkwood court, Ingleside Close, Highgrove Court and Gatcombe Court again in Beckenham, the last three being the innovative "catslide" roof design, again by Joyce Lowman.

Pullen developed extensively down Wells Park road, Sydenham and with Chevening Court built the whole of Brasted Close in Orpington, Kent. This is one of Pullen's last estates, reviving his old practice of naming his structures after Royal Houses. Pullen was a frequent visitor to Kenya where he created a racing complex in Nairobi and embarked on an ambitious project there to build a township including schools and hospitals. Pullen went on to form Bromley Industrial Consultants, based in Pall Mall, London, with the purpose of helping Third World nations develop.

Pullen Shops
Pullen also opened a series of general hardware shops, selling a wide range of products. These included his own brand of bleach "Pulbro", "Pink" parafin, wallpapers and paints, DIY and home appliances, cutlery and crockery, dustbins and ice-creams .  Branches covered south London, the first of these being on Catford Broadway. Pullen also owned and rented out many lock-up garages. Pullen became a millionaire and he enjoyed his wealth, and by July 1965 had bought his first new Rolls-Royce - Silver Cloud III Coupe from James Young, a luxury coachbuilder located in Bromley.

Race horses

Pullen was also able to indulge in his lifelong passion of horse racing, training and breeding, adopting the colours Chocolate and Blue for his racing silks. His friends included Peter Bromley, racing commentator, and Pullen went on to be a popular owner with a string of race horses, most famously at Josh Gifford's yard in Findon, Sussex. It was as such that he was interviewed by the Radio Times magazine ("Six owners in search of a winner" by Russell Twisk) in 1972, having especially bought a horse on Josh Gifford's recommendation for that year's Grand National at Aintree. Former jockey Bob Champion bought racehorse "Just Martin" for Pullen, who had built Champions yard and Pullen became Champions first owner when he took up training.

Final years
Frank Pullen formally retired in 1988 and he died, aged 76, at his livery yard in Orpington, Kent, and is buried at London Road Cemetery, Bromley. Racing enthusiast Queen Elizabeth the Queen Mother, whose nieces were patients of Royal Earlswood Hospital where Pullen's relatives James Henry Pullen and grandfather William Pullen were also notable residents, sent Frank's widow a letter of condolence upon hearing of his death.

References

External links
 The Radio Times, 8–14 April 1972
 The Sporting Life, 24 January 1992
This is Findon Village – The Horses of Frank H. Pullen
 Architectural Review 160:965.229 Corbusier as structural rationalist by Joyce Lowman
 Pictures and information about Pullen     * Evening Standard article about Pullen buildings

1915 births
1992 deaths
British real estate businesspeople
British racehorse owners and breeders
British Army personnel of World War II
British Army soldiers
People from Catford